Journalists for Democracy in Sri Lanka (JDS) is a group of journalists, human rights workers and other activists exiled from Sri Lanka based in Germany.
  It has reports on human rights and press freedom violations in Sri Lanka and provided videos of war crimes in Sri Lanka. When the United Nations Human Rights Council investigated war crimes in Sri Lanka in 2013, the Sri Lanka Broadcasting Corporation began censoring Tamil-language BBC broadcasts. JDS spoke out assertively against the government's move.

References

Human rights in Sri Lanka
Freedom of expression organizations
Journalism organizations in Europe
Sri Lankan journalism organisations